The Nordic Darts Masters is a darts tournament that has been held annually in Copenhagen, Denmark, since 2021.

2021 Nordic Darts Masters
2022 Nordic Darts Masters
2023 Nordic Darts Masters

Darts tournaments